The Baixa de Cassanje revolt is considered the first confrontation of the War of Independence in Angola and the Portuguese Colonial War throughout the Portuguese overseas provinces. The uprising began on 3 January 1961 in the region of Baixa do Cassanje, district of Malanje, Portuguese Angola. By the following day the Portuguese authorities had successfully suppressed the revolt. 4 January is now Colonial Martyrs Repression Day (Dia dos Mártires da Repressão Colonial), a national holiday in Angola.

Revolts

3 January
On 3 January 1961, agricultural workers employed by Cotonang, a Portuguese-Belgian cotton plantation company, staged a protest demanding improved working conditions. The protest, which later became known as the Baixa de Cassanje revolt, was led by two previously unknown Angolans, António Mariano and Kulu-Xingu. During the protest, the Angolan workers burned their identification cards and physically attacked Portuguese traders on the company premises.  The protest led to a general uprising, to which Portuguese authorities responded with an air raid the following day on twenty villages in the area, killing large numbers of villagers.  While the People's Movement for the Liberation of Angola (MPLA) claimed that the air raid killed some ten thousand people, most estimates range from 400 to as many as 7,000 killed. Colonial Martyrs Repression Day is commemorated each year with a public holiday on 4 January.

15 March
On 15 March, two months later, the União das Populações de Angola (UPA), led by Holden Roberto, staged a popular revolt in the Bakongo region of northern Angola.  Angolan Bantu farmers and coffee-plantation workers joined the uprising and in a frenzy of rage, killed some 1,000 white Angolans in a few days, together with an unknown number of natives. The rioters burned plantations, bridges, government facilities, and police stations, and destroyed several barges and ferries. Graphic images of raped and mutilated settlers inflamed the Portuguese public, and the Portuguese Army instituted a counter-insurgency campaign that destroyed dozens of villages and killed some 20,000 people before the uprising was put down in September 1961.

References

Angolan War of Independence
1961 in Angola
1961 in the Portuguese Empire
Baixa de Cassanje
Conflicts in 1961
Cold War rebellions
January 1961 events in Africa